UFC Fight Night: Nzechukwu vs. Cuțelaba (also known as UFC Fight Night 215, UFC on ESPN+ 73 and UFC Vegas 65) was a mixed martial arts event produced by the Ultimate Fighting Championship that took place on November 19, 2022, at the UFC Apex facility in Enterprise, Nevada, part of the Las Vegas Metropolitan Area, United States.

Background
A heavyweight bout between former UFC Heavyweight Championship challenger Derrick Lewis and Sergey Spivak was expected to headline the event. However, while the event was in progress, Lewis was forced to withdraw due to non-COVID, non-weight cutting illness and the bout was cancelled. As a result, the intended light heavyweight co-main event between Kennedy Nzechukwu and Ion Cuțelaba headlined the event, with the fight being confirmed as the new main event just an hour before the start of the main card.

Jack Shore was expected to face Kyler Phillips in a bantamweight bout. However, Shore suffered "a serious knee injury" and is not expect to return to competition before the end of 2022. As a result, Phillips was pulled from the event.

A light heavyweight bout between William Knight and Marcin Prachnio was scheduled for the event. However, the bout was scrapped a week before the event for undisclosed reasons.

A middleweight bout between Rodolfo Vieira and Cody Brundage was expected to take place at the event. However, Vieira pulled out from the event due to undisclosed reasons and the bout was scrapped.

Vince Morales was expected to face José Johnson in a bantamweight bout. However, Johnson pulled out for undisclosed reasons and was replaced by former LFA Bantamweight Champion Miles Johns.

Results

Bonus awards
The following fighters received $50,000 bonuses.
Fight of the Night: No bonus awarded.
Performance of the Night: Kennedy Nzechukwu, Muslim Salikhov, Jack Della Maddalena, and Natália Silva

See also 

 List of UFC events
 List of current UFC fighters
 2022 in UFC

References 

UFC Fight Night
2022 in mixed martial arts
November 2022 sports events in the United States
2022 in sports in Nevada
Mixed martial arts in Las Vegas
Sports competitions in Las Vegas